The Wetterhorn (3,692 m) is a peak in the Swiss Alps towering above the village of Grindelwald. Formerly known as Hasle Jungfrau, it is one of three summits on a mountain named the "Wetterhörner", the highest of which is the Mittelhorn (3,704 m) and the lowest and most distant the Rosenhorn (3,689 m). The latter peaks are mostly hidden from view from Grindelwald.

The Grosse Scheidegg Pass crosses the col to the north, between the Wetterhorn and the Schwarzhorn.

Ascents
The Wetterhorn summit was first reached on August 31, 1844, by the Grindelwald guides Hans Jaun and Melchior Bannholzer, three days after they had co-guided a large party organized by the geologist Édouard Desor to the first ascent of the Rosenhorn.  The Mittelhorn was first summitted on 9 July 1845 by the same guides, this time accompanied by a third, Kaspar Abplanalp, and by British climber Stanhope Templeman Speer. The son of a Scottish physician, Speer lived in Interlaken, Switzerland.

A September 1854 summit ascent by a party that included Alfred Wills, who apparently believed he'd made the first ascent, was much celebrated in Great Britain. Wills' description of this trip in his book "Wanderings Among the High Alps" (published in 1856) helped make mountaineering fashionable in Britain and ushered in the so-called golden age of alpinism, the systematic exploration of the Alps by British mountaineers. Despite several by then well-documented earlier ascents and the fact that he was guided to the top, Willis was lauded in his 1912 obituary as "Certainly the first who can be said with any confidence to have stood upon the real highest peak of the Wetterhorn proper" (i.e. the 3,692 m summit) In a subsequent corrigendum, the editors admitted two earlier ascents, but considered his still "the first completely successful" one.

In 1866, Lucy Walker was the first documented female to summit the peak.

The 24-year-old English mountaineer William Penhall and his Meiringen guide Andreas Maurer were killed by an avalanche high up on the Wetterhorn on 3 August 1882.

The famed guide and Grindelwald native Christian Almer climbed the mountain many times in his life, including on his first of many trips with Meta Brevoort and her nephew W. A. B. Coolidge in 1868. His last ascent was in 1898 at the age of 72 together with his wife to celebrate their golden anniversary on the summit.

Winston Churchill climbed the Wetterhorn in 1894.

Aerial tramway

The Wetterhorn summit was the intended terminal for the world's first passenger-carrying aerial tramway, but only the first quarter was built. It was in operation until the beginning of World War I.

References

External links 

 The Wetterhorn on Summitpost
 The Wetterhorn from Grindelwald First
 The Wetterhorn from the Eiger Trail
 

Mountains of Switzerland
Mountains of the Alps
Alpine three-thousanders
Bernese Alps
Mountains of the canton of Bern